Monopeltis capensis, also known commonly as the Cape spade-snouted worm lizard, the Cape wedge-snouted worm lizard, the Cape worm lizard, and the South African shield-snouted amphisbaenian, is a species of amphisbaenian in the family Amphisbaenidae. The species is native to southern Africa.

Geographic range
M. capensis is found in Botswana, South Africa, and Zimbabwe.

Habitat
The preferred natural habitats of M. capensis are grassland, shrubland, and savanna.

Description
M. capensis is uniformly pinkish white, both dorsally and ventrally.

Diet
M. capensis burrows in red soils to preys upon beetle larvae, termites, and other small invertebrates.

Reproduction
M. capensis is viviparous. A brood of 1–3 is born in summer.

References

Further reading
Broadley DG (1997). "A review of the Monopeltis capensis complex in southern Africa (Reptilia: Amphisbaenidae)". African Journal of Herpetology 46 (1): 1–12. (Monopeltis capensis, p. 8).
Gans C (2005). "Checklist and Bibliography of the Amphisbaenia of the World". Bulletin of the American Museum of Natural History (289): 1–130. (Monopeltis capensis, p. 35).
Measey GJ, Tolley KA (2013). "A molecular phylogeny for sub-Saharan amphisbaenians". African Journal of Herpetology 62 (2): 100–108.
Smith A (1848). Illustrations of the Zoology of South Africa; Consisting Chiefly of Figures and Descriptions of the Objects of Natural History Collected during an Expedition into the Interior of South Africa, in the Years 1834, 1835, and 1836; Fitted out by "The Cape of Good Hope Association for Exploring Central Africa:" Together with a Summary of African Zoology, and an Inquiry into the Geographical Ranges of Species in that Quarter of the Globe. [Volume III. Reptilia]. London: Lords Commissioners of her Majesty's Treasury. (Smith, Elder and Co., printers). 78 plates + unnumbered pages of text. (Monopeltis capensis, new species, Plate 67 + two unnumbered pages).

Monopeltis
Reptiles of Botswana
Reptiles of South Africa
Reptiles of Zimbabwe
Reptiles described in 1848
Taxa named by Andrew Smith (zoologist)